Oescus Island is the low ice-free island in the Onogur group off the northwest coast of Robert Island in the South Shetland Islands, Antarctica extending 380 m in southeast-northwest direction and 40 m wide.  The feature comprises two parts connected by a spit, and is separated from Redina Island, Kovach Island and Leeve Island by passages 120 m, 160 m and 130 m wide respectively.

The island is named after the ancient Roman town of Oescus in Northern Bulgaria.

Location

British mapping in 1968 and Bulgarian mapping in 2009.

See also
 List of Antarctic and subantarctic islands

Maps
 Livingston Island to King George Island.  Scale 1:200000.  Admiralty Nautical Chart 1776.  Taunton: UK Hydrographic Office, 1968.
 L.L. Ivanov. Antarctica: Livingston Island and Greenwich, Robert, Snow and Smith Islands. Scale 1:120000 topographic map. Troyan: Manfred Wörner Foundation, 2009.  (Second edition 2010)
Antarctic Digital Database (ADD). Scale 1:250000 topographic map of Antarctica. Scientific Committee on Antarctic Research (SCAR). Since 1993, regularly upgraded and updated.

References
 Oescus Island. SCAR Composite Antarctic Gazetteer.
 Bulgarian Antarctic Gazetteer. Antarctic Place-names Commission. (details in Bulgarian, basic data in English)

External links
 Oescus Island. Copernix satellite image

Islands of Robert Island
Bulgaria and the Antarctic